The Oxford Dictionary of Islam is a dictionary of Islam, published by the Oxford University Press, with John Esposito as editor-in-chief.

Overview
The dictionary contains over 2,000 entries on a wide range of Islamic related topics.

References

External links
Review on atheism.about.com
Oxford Dictionary of Islam in ebook form at Oxford Reference Online (subscription required.)

2004 non-fiction books
Books about Islam
Islam